Lockyer is a lunar impact crater that is located along the western wall of the large walled plain Janssen. It was named after British astrophysicist Norman Lockyer. This crater is roughly circular with a slight outward bulge along the eastern side. The edge of the rim is only lightly eroded, with an indentation in the side to the north-northwest. The interior floor is relatively featureless, except for a small crater along the edge of the southern inner wall.

Satellite craters 

By convention these features are identified on lunar maps by placing the letter on the side of the crater midpoint that is closest to Lockyer.

References 

 
 
 
 
 
 
 
 
 
 
 

Impact craters on the Moon